When a traffic stop is made, a warning issued by the officer is a statement that the motorist has committed some offense, but is being spared the actual citation. Officers use their own discretion whether to issue a citation or warning. The motorist may receive the warning either verbally or written, but will not be charged with the offense, will not have to pay a fine, and will not receive any points. Depending on the laws of the jurisdiction, the warning may or may not appear on records visible to officers, which, if it does, could result in another stop within a fixed period of time leading to an actual citation, or in some cases, the motorist may be charged with both offenses.

Criticism of warnings
One criticism of warnings is the possibility that officers may offer them to some motorists and not to others based on favoritism, singling them out over factors such as their race, attractive appearance, the vehicle they are driving, the way they are dressed, or their social class. Warnings can be difficult to challenge, which could be a violation of due process of law. They adversely affect a driver's CSA score, and cannot be reversed like a successfully challenged citation.

See also
 Police caution

References

Traffic law
Law enforcement